Amphilophium is a genus of flowering plants in the family Bignoniaceae, native to South America. Amphilophium crucigerum (syn. Pithecoctenium crucigerum) has escaped from cultivation elsewhere, and has become an invasive weed in Australia.

Taxonomy
The genus Amphilophium was erected by Kunth in 1818, the type species being Amphilophium paniculatum, transferred from Bignonia. Many other genera have since been synonymized with Amphilophium.

Species
Amphilophium arenarium (A.H.Gentry) L.G.Lohmann
Amphilophium aschersonii Ule
Amphilophium bauhinioides (Bureau ex Baill.) L.G.Lohmann
Amphilophium blanchetii (DC.) Bureau & K.Schum.
Amphilophium bracteatum (Cham.) L.G.Lohmann
Amphilophium buccinatorium (DC.) L.G.Lohmann
Amphilophium chocoense (A.H.Gentry) L.G.Lohmann
Amphilophium cremersii (A.H.Gentry) L.G.Lohmann
Amphilophium crucigerum (L.) L.G.Lohmann
Amphilophium cuneifolium (DC.) L.G.Lohmann
Amphilophium cynanchoides (DC.) L.G.Lohmann
Amphilophium dasytrichum (Sandwith) L.G.Lohmann
Amphilophium dolichoides (Cham.) L.G.Lohmann
Amphilophium dusenianum (Kraenzl.) L.G.Lohmann
Amphilophium ecuadorense A.H.Gentry
Amphilophium elongatum (Vahl) L.G.Lohmann
Amphilophium falcatum (Vell.) L.G.Lohmann
Amphilophium frutescens (DC.) L.G.Lohmann
Amphilophium glaziovii Bureau ex K.Schum.
Amphilophium gnaphalanthum (A.Rich.) L.G.Lohmann
Amphilophium granulosum (Klotzsch) L.G.Lohmann
Amphilophium lactiflorum (Vahl) L.G.Lohmann
Amphilophium laevis (Sandwith) L.G.Lohmann
Amphilophium laxiflorum (DC.) L.G.Lohmann
Amphilophium magnoliifolium (Kunth) L.G.Lohmann
Amphilophium mansoanum (DC.) L.G.Lohmann
Amphilophium nunezii (A.H.Gentry) L.G.Lohmann
Amphilophium obovatum (Sandwith) L.G.Lohmann
Amphilophium occidentale (A.H.Gentry) L.G.Lohmann
Amphilophium paniculatum (L.) Kunth
Amphilophium pannosum (DC.) Bureau & K.Schum.
Amphilophium parkeri (DC.) L.G.Lohmann
Amphilophium pauciflorum (A.H.Gentry) L.G.Lohmann
Amphilophium perbracteatum A.H.Gentry
Amphilophium pilosum Standl.
Amphilophium porphyrotrichum (Sandwith) L.G.Lohmann
Amphilophium pulverulentum (Sandwith) L.G.Lohmann
Amphilophium reticulatum (A.H.Gentry) L.G.Lohmann
Amphilophium rodriguesii (A.H.Gentry) L.G.Lohmann
Amphilophium sandwithii Fabris
Amphilophium scabriusculum (Mart. ex DC.) L.G.Lohmann
Amphilophium stamineum (Lam.) L.G.Lohmann
Amphilophium steyermarkii (A.H.Gentry) L.G.Lohmann

References

Bignoniaceae
Bignoniaceae genera